Diasemia accalis is a moth in the family Crambidae. It was described by Francis Walker in 1859. It is found in Sumatra, Indonesia, China, the north-western Himalayas, Myanmar, Malaysia, Taiwan, Korea, Japan, the Democratic Republic of the Congo and Rwanda.

References

Moths described in 1859
Spilomelinae